André Marques (born 1975) is a Brazilian jazz pianist working with the Hermeto Pascoal group since the mid-1990s.

References 

Brazilian jazz pianists
Living people
1975 births
21st-century pianists